The St. Louis Cardinals are a Major League Baseball (MLB) franchise based in St. Louis, Missouri. They play in the National League Central division. Since the institution of MLB's Rule 4 Draft, the Cardinals have selected 77 players in the first round. Officially known as the "First-Year Player Draft", the Rule 4 Draft is MLB's primary mechanism for assigning amateur baseball players from high schools, colleges, and other amateur baseball clubs to its teams. The draft order is determined based on the previous season's standings, with the team possessing the worst record receiving the first pick. In addition, teams which lost free agents in the previous off-season may be awarded compensatory or supplementary picks.

Of the 77 players picked in the first round by St. Louis, 39 have been pitchers, the most of any position; 30 of them were right-handed, while nine were left-handed. Eight outfielders, ten third basemen, six shortstops, six first basemen, five catchers, and two second basemen were taken as well. The team also drafted one player, Leron Lee (1966), who played as an infielder. 16 of the players came from high schools or universities in the state of California, and Texas and Arizona follow with seven and six players. The Cardinals have not drafted any players from their home state of Missouri.

Three of the Cardinals draft picks have won World Series rings with the team. Braden Looper (1996) and Chris Duncan (1999) were both members of the major league roster when the Cardinals won the 2006 World Series. Lance Lynn was with the 2011 World Series winners.  None of the Cardinals' first-round picks have been elected to the Baseball Hall of Fame, and no picks have won the Cy Young Award. Todd Worrell (1982) is the only first-round pick of the Cardinals to earn the MLB Rookie of the Year award with the team, winning it in 1986. The Cardinals have never held the first overall pick in the draft, and have only held a top five pick three times. The highest pick the Cardinals have held was the third overall pick, which they used on Looper in 1996.

The Cardinals have made 18 selections in the supplemental round of the draft and 27 compensatory picks since the institution of the First-Year Player Draft in 1965. These additional picks are provided when a team loses a particularly valuable free agent in the previous off-season, or, more recently, if a team fails to sign a draft pick from the previous year. As the Cardinals have signed all of their first-round picks, they have never been awarded a supplementary pick under this provision.

Key

Picks

See also
St. Louis Cardinals minor league players

Footnotes
 Through the 2012 draft, free agents were evaluated by the Elias Sports Bureau and rated "Type A", "Type B", or not compensation-eligible. If a team offered arbitration to a player but that player refused and subsequently signed with another team, the original team was able to receive additional draft picks. If a "Type A" free agent left in this way, his previous team received a supplemental pick and a compensatory pick from the team with which he signed. If a "Type B" free agent left in this way, his previous team received only a supplemental pick. Since the 2013 draft, free agents are no longer classified by type; instead, compensatory picks are only awarded if the team offered its free agent a contract worth at least the average of the 125 current richest MLB contracts. However, if the free agent's last team acquired the player in a trade during the last year of his contract, it is ineligible to receive compensatory picks for that player.
 The Cardinals gained a compensatory first-round pick in 1988 from the New York Yankees for losing free agent Jack Clark.
 The Cardinals gained a supplemental first-round pick in 1988 for losing free agent Jack Clark.
 The Cardinals gained a compensatory first-round pick in 1990 from the Boston Red Sox for losing free agent Tony Peña.
 The Cardinals gained a supplemental first-round pick in 1990 for losing free agent Tony Peña.
 The Cardinals gained a compensatory first-round pick in 1991 from the Toronto Blue Jays for losing free agent Ken Dayley.
 The Cardinals gained a compensatory first-round pick in 1991 from the New York Mets for losing free agent Vince Coleman.
 The Cardinals gained a supplemental first-round pick in 1991 for losing free agent Vince Coleman.
 The Cardinals gained a supplemental first-round pick in 1991 for losing free agent Ken Dayley.
 The Cardinals gained a supplemental first-round pick in 1995 for losing free agent Gregg Jefferies.
 The Cardinals gained a supplemental first-round pick in 1998 for losing free agent Dennis Eckersley.
 The Cardinals gained a compensatory first-round pick in 1999 from the Atlanta Braves for losing free agent Brian Jordan.
 The Cardinals gained a supplemental first-round pick in 1999 for losing free agent Brian Jordan.
 The Cardinals gained a supplemental first-round pick in 1999 for losing free agent Delino DeShields.
 The Cardinals gained a compensatory first-round pick in 2000 from the Texas Rangers for losing free agent Darren Oliver.
 The Cardinals lost their first-round pick in 2002 to the Oakland Athletics as compensation for signing free agent Jason Isringhausen.
 The Cardinals gained a compensatory first-round pick in 2005 from the Boston Red Sox for losing free agent Édgar Rentería.
 The Cardinals gained a supplemental first-round pick in 2005 for losing free agent Édgar Rentería.
 The Cardinals gained a supplemental first-round pick in 2005 for losing free agent Mike Matheny.
 The Cardinals gained a supplemental first-round pick in 2006 for losing free agent Matt Morris.
 The Cardinals gained a supplemental first-round pick in 2007 for losing free agent Jeff Suppan.
 The Cardinals gained a supplemental first-round pick in 2008 for losing free agent Troy Percival.
 The Cardinals gained a supplemental first-round pick in 2010 for losing free agent Mark DeRosa.
 The Cardinals gained a supplemental first-round pick in 2010 for losing free agent Joel Piñeiro.
 The Cardinals gained a compensatory first-round pick in 2012 from the Los Angeles Angels of Anaheim for losing free agent Albert Pujols.
 The Cardinals gained a supplemental first-round pick in 2012 for losing free agent Albert Pujols.
 The Cardinals gained a supplemental first-round pick in 2012 for losing free agent Darren Oliver.
 The Cardinals gained a supplemental first-round pick in 2012 for losing free agent Edwin Jackson.
 The Cardinals gained a compensatory first-round pick in 2013 from the Milwaukee Brewers for losing free agent Kyle Lohse.
 The Cardinals gained a compensatory first-round pick in 2014 from the New York Yankees for losing free agent Carlos Beltrán.
 The Cardinals gained a compensatory first-round pick in 2016 from the Chicago Cubs for losing free agent John Lackey.
 The Cardinals gained a compensatory first-round pick in 2016 from the Chicago Cubs for losing free agent Jason Heyward.

References
General references

In-text citations

First-round
St. Louis Cardinals
St. Louis Cardinals players